Dharmapukuria Gram Panchayat, consists of seven villages: Sukpukuria, Madhabpur, Savaipur, Monigram, Dharmapukuria, Raipur and Panchita. It has 12 booths, 14 elected Gram panchayat members, and three block members. Panchita is also known as Chanda Bazar.

Schools
Dharmapukuria gram panchayat schools list shown and counted by election commission are as follows 1.Chanda Lalit Mohan High School 2. Ramchandrapur High School Manigram High school

References

Government of West Bengal
North 24 Parganas district
Gram panchayats in West Bengal